Gormley is a surname of Irish origin. The main sept of the clan originated in what was Tyrconnell, now mainly County Donegal, Republic of Ireland, in the west of Ulster, the northern province in Ireland. The Ulster branch of the clan were chiefs of the Cenél Moan and originated in what is now the barony of Raphoe in East Donegal, an area known in Gaelic times as Tír Moain. The common ancestor and progenitor of these Gormleys was Moain son of Muireadach, son of Eoghan (who gave his name to Tyrone), son of Niall of the Nine Hostages.

Different septs and spellings
In the Annals of the Four Masters and in the Topographical Poems of O'Dugan and O'Heerin, the name is spelt Ó Goirmleadhaigh; the Annals of Loch Cé write it Ó Gormshuil and Ó Gormshuiligh: the editor (William Hennessy) writing in 1871 states that the latter was then anglicised O'Gormooly, but Gormley is universal today. The name means “blue spearman”.

In the Partry Mountains of County Mayo in the West of Ireland is found a sept also called Gormley, Gormaly and Gormilly. The Irish form of this family's name is Ó Goirmghialla or possibly Ó Gormghaille, both Irish forms meaning “blue hostage”. They were chiefs of this area along with the Darcy or Dorcey family. The present parish of Ballyovey, also called the parish of Party, shows the location of this ancient territory in Mayo. In the area of Lough Key, County Roscommon, we find families of the name (O') Gormaly or Gormally. O'Donovan says that these are quite distinct from the O'Gormleys of County Tyrone and that the Irish form of this name is Ó Garmghaile. It is likely that this family is of the same stock as the Mayo sept, but it is unclear if both are related to the main sept of Ulster.

In seventeenth century records they are found both as O'Gormley and Mac Gormley, located chiefly in counties Armagh and Londonderry in modern-day Northern Ireland, but also in County Roscommon and County Westmeath, Republic of Ireland. Gormleys today are chiefly found in County Tyrone, Northern Ireland, and surrounding areas.

People 
 Andrew Gormley, American drummer for the band Rorschach
 Antony Gormley (born 1950), British sculptor
 Beatrice Gormley, American children's writer
 Bob Gormley (born 1918), former U.S. soccer forward
 Charles Gormley (1937–2005), Scottish film director
 Conor Gormley (born 1980), Gaelic footballer from Carrickmore in County Tyrone
 Dave Gormley, Scottish drummer with ac acoustics, Eugene Kelly, Isobel Campbell, Vera Cruise
 Eddie Gormley (born 1968), former Irish football player
 Enda Gormley (born 1966), Irish Gaelic footballer
Everett Gormley (born 2000), American model
 Francis Gormley, Irish politician
 Jody Gormley, former Gaelic footballer for Tyrone, and London
 Joe Gormley (disambiguation), several people
 John Gormley (born 1959), Irish Green party politician
 John Kenneth Gormley (born 1957), Canadian broadcaster and former politician
 Joseph L. Gormley (1914–2004), chief of chemistry and toxicology for the FBI
 Ken Gormley, President of Duquesne University in Pittsburgh, Pennsylvania
 Ken Gormley, bass player from Australian band The Cruel Sea
 Kiera Gormley, Irish model
 Mark Gormley, singer-songwriter from Pensacola, Florida
 Mary Gormley, Irish beauty contestant
 Niall Gormley, Gaelic footballer in County Tyrone
 Paddy Gormley (1916–2001), Irish nationalist politician
 Peter Gormley (died 1998), Australian music manager
 Phil Gormley (born 1963), former Chief Constable of Police Scotland
 Rowan Gormley (born 1962), South African-born entrepreneur
 Tad Gormley (1884–1965), former head of the New Orleans Gymnastics Club and Amateur Athletic Union
 Tom Gormley (1916–1984), politician in County Tyrone, served in the House of Commons of Northern Ireland
 Tom Gormley, American professional football player
 Tony Gormley (1962–1987), member of the Provisional Irish Republican Army (PIRA)
 William T. Gormley, professor of Government at Georgetown University

References

External links
  Origins of the Gormleys

Surnames
Surnames of Irish origin
Irish families